The Hawai River is a river of New Zealand. It flows from the Raukumara Range northeast into the Bay of Plenty.

See also
List of rivers of New Zealand

References

Land Information New Zealand - Search for Place Names

Rivers of the Bay of Plenty Region
Rivers of New Zealand